Joshua Abraham Norton (4 February, 18188 January, 1880), known as Emperor Norton, was a resident of San Francisco, California who in 1859 proclaimed himself "'Norton I., Emperor of the United States". In 1863, after Napoleon III invaded Mexico, he took the secondary title of "Protector of Mexico".

Norton was born in England but spent most of his early life  in South Africa. Leaving Cape Town, probably in late 1845, he arrived in Boston, via Liverpool, in March 1846 and San Francisco in late 1849. For the first few years after arriving in San Francisco, Norton made a successful living as a commodities trader and real estate speculator. However, he was financially ruined  following a failed bid to corner the rice market during a shortage prompted by a famine in China. He then lost a protracted lawsuit in which he tried to void his rice contract, and his local prominence faded.

Norton did not disappear from the scene completely. However, he dramatically "reset" his relationship to the world around him in September 1859, when he proclaimed himself "Emperor of the United States". Norton had no formal political power; nevertheless, he was treated deferentially in San Francisco, and currency issued in his name was honoured in some establishments that he frequented. Some considered Norton to be insane or eccentric, but residents of San Francisco and the city's larger Northern California orbit enjoyed his imperial presence and took note of his frequent newspaper proclamations. Though Norton received free ferry and train passage and a variety of favours, such as help with rent and free meals, from well-placed friends and sympathisers, the city's merchants also capitalised on his notoriety by selling souvenirs bearing his image. "San Francisco lived off the Emperor Norton," Norton's biographer William Drury wrote, "not Norton off San Francisco".

On 8 January, 1880, Norton collapsed at the corner of California and Dupont (now Grant) streets and died before he could be given medical treatment. According to the San Francisco Chronicle, upwards of 10,000 people lined the streets of San Francisco to pay him homage at his funeral. Norton has been immortalised as the basis of characters in the literature of Mark Twain, Robert Louis Stevenson, Christopher Moore, Morris and René Goscinny, Selma Lagerlöf, Neil Gaiman, Mircea Cărtărescu and Charles Bukowski.

Early life
Norton's parents were John Norton (d. 1848) and Sarah Nordon (d. 1846), who were English Jews. John was a farmer and merchant, and Sarah was a daughter of Abraham Norden and a sister of Benjamin Norden, a successful merchant. The family moved to South Africa in early 1820 as part of a government-backed colonial scheme whose participants came to be known as the 1820 Settlers. Most likely, Norton was born in the Kentish town of Deptford, today part of London.

The best available evidence points to 4 February, 1818, as the date of Norton's birth. Obituaries published in 1880, following Norton's death, offered conflicting information about his date of birth. The second of two obituaries in the San Francisco Chronicle, "following the best information obtainable," cited the silver plate on his coffin which said he was "aged about 65", suggesting that 1815 could be the year of his birth. However, Norton's biographer, William Drury, points out that "about 65" was based solely on the guess that Norton's landlady offered to the coroner at the inquest following his death. In a 1923 essay published by the California Historical Society, Robert Ernest Cowan claimed that Norton was born on 4 February, 1819. However, the passenger lists for the La Belle Alliance, the ship that carried Norton and his family from England to South Africa, list him as having been two years old when the ship set sail in February 1820. This information appears not to have been known until after 1934, the year that Norton's headstone was placed at his grave in Colma, California — when Cowan's account remained prominent. This may help to explain why those who had the stone made used 1819 as the birth year.

The 4 February, 1865, edition of The Daily Alta California newspaper included an item in which the Alta wished Emperor Norton a happy 47th birthday, indicating that his birth date was February 4, 1818 (not 1819, as Cowan claimed)—a date that would line up with La Belle Alliances passenger list from 2 years later. Moreover, when Cowan quoted the 1865 Alta item in his essay, he used an altered version in an apparent attempt to advance his claim of an 1819 birth date. Persistent claims for an 1819 birth date are of doubtful provenance, tracing to unsubstantiated assertions made online, during the early years of the internet. The Emperor Norton Trust, a nonprofit organization that engages in Norton research and education, produced a 2018 bicentennial series, Emperor Norton at 200, that took as its starting point a February 4, 1818, birth date for Norton. Supporting and participating in the series were a number of institutions that long have helped to preserve the historical record of Emperor Norton: the California Historical Society, the San Francisco Public Library, the Mechanics' Institute and the Society of California Pioneers.

There are often-repeated historical claims that Joshua Norton arrived in San Francisco on a specific vessel, the Franzeska, on November 23, 1849; that he arrived with $40,000, in whole or in part a bequest from his father's estate; and that he parlayed this into a fortune of $250,000. None of this is substantiated by contemporaneous documentation. What is known is that, after Norton arrived in San Francisco, he enjoyed a good deal of success in commodities markets and in real estate speculation, and that by late 1852, he was one of the more prosperous, respected citizens of the city.

In December 1852, Norton thought he saw a business opportunity when China, facing a severe famine, placed a ban on the export of rice, causing the price of rice in San Francisco to increase from four to thirty-six cents per pound (9 to 79 cents/kg). When he heard the Glyde, which was returning from Peru, was carrying  of rice, he bought the entire shipment for $25,000 (or twelve and a half cents per pound), hoping to corner the market. Shortly after he signed the contract, several other shiploads of rice arrived from Peru, causing the price of rice to plummet to three cents a pound. Norton tried to void the contract, stating the dealer had misled him as to the quality of rice to expect. 

For nearly two years, from early 1853 to late 1854, Norton and the rice dealers were involved in a protracted litigation. Although Norton prevailed in the lower courts, the case reached the Supreme Court of California, which ruled against him in October 1854. Later, the Lucas Turner and Company bank foreclosed on his real estate holdings in North Beach to pay Norton's debt. He filed for insolvency in August 1856.

Norton continued to run newspaper ads selling various commodities. Although these ads appear to have run their course by mid 1857, there are other public traces of Norton during this period. In September 1857, he served on a jury for a case of a man accused of stealing a bar of gold from Wells, Fargo & Co. and, in August 1858, Norton ran an ad announcing his candidacy for U.S. Congress. By this time, he was living in reduced circumstances at a working class boarding house.

Reign as emperor

Declaring himself emperor

By 1859, Norton had become completely discontented with what he considered the inadequacies of the legal and political structures of the United States. In July 1859, he issued a brief manifesto addressed to the “Citizens of the Union”. It outlined in the broadest terms the national crisis as Joshua saw it and suggested the imperative for action to address this crisis at the most basic level. The manifesto ran as a paid ad in the San Francisco Daily Evening Bulletin.

Two months later, on September 17, 1859, Norton hand-delivered the following letter, declaring himself "Emperor of these United States", to the offices of the Bulletin:

The paper printed the letter in that evening's edition, for humorous effect, and thus began Norton's whimsical 21-year "reign" over the United States.

Norton issued numerous decrees on matters of state, including a decree on October 12, 1859, to formally abolish the United States Congress. In it, he observed:

In this same decree, Norton repeated his order that all interested parties assemble at Musical Hall in San Francisco in February 1860 to "remedy the evil complained of."

In an imperial decree issued in January 1860, Norton summoned the Army to depose the elected officials of the U.S. Congress:

Norton's orders were ignored by the Army, and Congress likewise continued without any formal acknowledgement of the decree. A decree in July 1860 ordered the dissolution of the republic in favor of a temporary monarchy. Norton issued a mandate in 1862 ordering both the Roman Catholic Church and the Protestant churches to publicly ordain him as "Emperor", hoping to resolve the many disputes that had resulted in the Civil War.

Norton then turned his attention to other matters, both political and social. In a proclamation dated August 12, 1869, and published in the San Francisco Daily Herald, he declared the abolition of the Democratic and Republican parties, explaining that he was "desirous of allaying the dissensions of party strife now existing within our realm."  

The failure to treat Norton's adopted home city with appropriate respect was the subject of a particularly stern edict that often is cited as having been written by Norton in 1872, although evidence is elusive for the authorship, date, or source of this decree:

Norton was occasionally a visionary, and some of his imperial decrees exhibited profound foresight. He is said to have issued instructions to form a League of Nations, he explicitly forbade any form of conflict between religions or their sects, and he issued several decrees calling for the construction of a suspension bridge or tunnel connecting Oakland and San Francisco—with the last of these decrees showing his irritation at the lack of prompt obedience by the authorities:

Long after his death, similar structures were built in the form of the San Francisco–Oakland Bay Bridge and the Transbay Tube, and there have been efforts since the 1930s to name the Bay Bridge after Emperor Norton or at least to add "Emperor Norton Bridge" as an honorary name for the bridge.

Norton's imperial acts

Norton spent most of his daylight hours inspecting the streets; spending time in parks and libraries; and paying visits to newspaper offices and old friends in San Francisco, Oakland and Berkeley. In the evenings, he often was seen at political gatherings or at theatrical or musical performances.

He wore an elaborate blue uniform with gold-plated epaulettes, at some time given to him secondhand by officers of the United States Army post at the Presidio of San Francisco. He embellished this with a variety of accoutrements, including a beaver hat decorated with a peacock or ostrich feathers and a rosette, a walking stick and an umbrella. In the course of his rounds, he took note of the condition of the sidewalks and cable cars, the state of repair of public property, and the appearance of police officers. He also often had conversations on the issues of the day with those he encountered.

Norton caricaturist Edward Jump started a rumor that two noted stray dogs, named Bummer and Lazarus, were Norton's pets. Norton ate at free-lunch counters where he shared his meals with the dogs, although he did not in fact own them.

Special officer Armand Barbier was part of a local auxiliary force whose members were called "policemen" but in fact were private security guards paid by neighborhood residents and business owners, and he arrested Norton in 1867 to commit him to involuntary treatment for a mental disorder. The arrest outraged the citizens and sparked scathing editorials in the newspapers, including the Daily Alta which wrote "that he had shed no blood; robbed no one; and despoiled no country; which is more than can be said of his fellows in that line". Police Chief Patrick Crowley ordered Norton released and issued a formal apology on behalf of the police force, and Norton granted an Imperial Pardon to Barbier. Police officers of San Francisco thereafter saluted him as he passed in the street.

Norton did receive some tokens of recognition for his position. The 1870 U.S. census lists Joshua Norton as 50 years old and residing at 624 Commercial Street, and his occupation is listed as "Emperor". It also notes that he was insane.

During the 1860s and 1870s, there were occasional anti-Chinese demonstrations in the poorer districts of San Francisco, and riots took place, sometimes resulting in fatalities. Starting in the late 1870s, these riots were fomented at rallies that took place on Sunday afternoons at the sandlots across from City Hall. The rallies were led by Denis Kearney, a leader of the anti-Chinese Workingmen's Party of California. At a sandlot rally held on April 28, 1878, Emperor Norton appeared just before the start of proceedings, stood on a small box and challenged Kearney directly, telling him and the assembled crowd to disperse and go home. Norton was unsuccessful, but the incident was widely reported in local papers over the next couple of days.

Norton issued his own money in the form of scrip, or promissory notes, which were accepted from him by some restaurants in San Francisco. These notes came in denominations between fifty cents and ten dollars, and the few surviving notes are collector's items that routinely sell for more than $10,000 at auction.

Foreign diplomacy 
Throughout his reign, Norton commented on the policies and actions of foreign governments, issuing proclamations and sending letters to foreign leaders in attempts to establish congenial and fruitful relations with them and their countries and, if he felt it necessary, to cajole better behavior.

In 1862, Mexico was invaded by French Emperor Napoleon III after not being able to pay war reparations after the disastrous Reform War. Napoleon installed the Habsburg Maximilian I as his puppet ruler. That news would quickly reach the United States, and in San Francisco one man suggested that Emperor Norton take the title "Protector of Mexico"—both because no one had been appointed protector yet and because of a popular legend stating Norton was the son of Napoleon III. Norton happily obliged adding the title to many of his proclamations, but he later would revoke this title, stating, "It is impossible to protect such an unsettled nation".

Norton wrote Queen Victoria multiple letters suggesting they could marry to strengthen ties between their nations. This would ultimately prove futile, as the queen never responded.

Norton also sent multiple letters to Kamehameha V, the King of Hawaii at the time, regarding an estate in the Kingdom of Hawaii. Near the end of his reign Kamehameha would refuse to recognize the democratic U.S. government, instead opting to only recognize Norton as sole leader of the United States.

Later years and death
Norton was the subject of many tales. One popular story suggested that he was the son of Emperor Napoleon III and that his claim of coming from South Africa was a ruse to prevent persecution. Rumours also circulated that Norton was supremely wealthy and was feigning poverty because he was miserly.

Starting a few years after Norton declared himself emperor, local newspapers—notably, the Daily Alta California—began to print fictitious decrees; it is believed that newspaper editors themselves drafted these fake proclamations to suit their own agendas. Weary of this, Norton in January 1871 named the black-owned and -operated Pacific Appeal his "imperial organ." Between September 1870 and May 1875, the Appeal published some 250 proclamations over the signature of Norton I. Historians and researchers who have studied Norton closely generally regard these proclamations as being authentic.

On the evening of January 8, 1880, Norton collapsed on the corner of California Street and Dupont Street (now Grant Avenue) in front of Old Saint Mary's Cathedral while on his way to a lecture at the California Academy of Sciences. His collapse was immediately noticed, and "the police officer on the beat hastened for a carriage to convey him to the City Receiving Hospital", according to the next day's obituary in the San Francisco Morning Call. Norton died before a carriage could arrive. The Call reported, "On the reeking pavement, in the darkness of a moonless night, under the dripping rain... Norton I, by the grace of God, Emperor of the United States and Protector of Mexico, departed this life". Two days later, the San Francisco Chronicle led its article on Norton's funeral with the headline "Le Roi Est Mort." (lit. "The King is dead")

It quickly became evident that Norton had died in complete poverty, contrary to rumours of wealth. Five or six dollars in small change was found on his person, and a search of his room at the boarding house on Commercial Street turned up a single gold sovereign, worth around $2.50. His possessions included his collection of walking sticks, his rather battered sabre, a variety of headgear including a stovepipe, a derby, a red-laced Army cap, and another cap suited to a martial band-master, an 1828 French franc, and a handful of the Imperial bonds that he sold to tourists at a fictitious 7% interest. There were fake telegrams purporting to be from Tsar Alexander II of Russia congratulating Norton on his forthcoming marriage to Queen Victoria, and from the President of France predicting that such a union would be disastrous to world peace. Also found were his letters to Queen Victoria and 98 shares of stock in a defunct gold mine.

Initial funeral arrangements were for a pauper's coffin of simple redwood. However, members of a San Francisco businessmen's association called the Pacific Club established a funeral fund that provided for a handsome rosewood casket and arranged a dignified farewell. Norton's funeral on Sunday, January 10 was solemn, mournful, and large. Paying their respects were members of "all classes from capitalists to the pauper, the clergyman to the pickpocket, well-dressed ladies and those whose garb and bearing hinted of the social outcast". The next day, the San Francisco Chronicle reported, under the headline "Le Roi Est Mort," that some 10,000 people had come to view the emperor's body in advance of the 2 p.m. funeral. Notwithstanding the later legend of a "two-mile-long cortege," the Chronicle reported in the same article that people lined the streets for only the first block or two; the emperor's casket was attended by "only three carriages," with no mourners on foot; and that there were "about thirty people" at the burial service in the Masonic Cemetery.

In 1934, Norton's remains were transferred to a grave site at Woodlawn Memorial Park Cemetery in Colma, California.

In popular culture

Details of Norton's life story may have been forgotten, but he has been immortalized in literature. Mark Twain resided in San Francisco during part of Emperor Norton's public life, and he modeled the character of the King in Adventures of Huckleberry Finn on him. Robert Louis Stevenson made Norton a character in his 1892 novel The Wrecker. Stevenson's stepdaughter Isobel Osbourne mentioned Norton in her autobiography This Life I've Loved, stating that he "was a gentle and kindly man, and fortunately found himself in the friendliest and most sentimental city in the world, the idea being 'let him be emperor if he wants to.' San Francisco played the game with him."

In more modern times, the life of Emperor Norton is the inspiration for L'Empereur Smith, a Lucky Luke comic book adventure published in 1976. Norton also appears as a character in the comic book The Sandman, Vol. 2, No. 31, "Three Septembers and a January", by Neil Gaiman and Shawn McManus, and is voiced by John Lithgow in the audio book version of the comic. He appeared briefly in Captain America Comics #11.

There have been a number of television adaptations of the Norton story. In the June 15, 1956, episode of the western anthology series Death Valley Days, titled "Emperor Norton", Parker Garvie played the title character. In the February 27, 1966, episode of the western television series Bonanza, titled "The Emperor Norton", Sam Jaffe played the lead role. The episode also featured William Challee as Sam Clemens, a.k.a. Mark Twain. In the December 18, 1956 episode of Broken Arrow (TV series) season 1, episode 11, titled "The Conspirators" Florenz Ames played the "Emperor Norton".

Since 1974, the Imperial Council of San Francisco has been conducting an annual pilgrimage to Norton's grave in Colma, California, just outside San Francisco. In January 1980, ceremonies were conducted in San Francisco to honor the 100th anniversary of the death of "the one and only Emperor of the United States".

The Emperor Norton Trust—founded and based in San Francisco from 2013 to 2019, and originally known as The Emperor's Bridge Campaign—is a nonprofit that engages in research, education, and advocacy to advance the legacy of Emperor Norton.

Emperor Norton is considered a patron saint of Discordianism, and a park in the Republic of Molossia is named "Norton Park".

Naming efforts
There have been perennial efforts to name major public landmarks after Emperor Norton.

San Francisco–Oakland Bay Bridge
In 1939, the group E Clampus Vitus commissioned a plaque commemorating Emperor Norton's call for the construction of a suspension bridge between San Francisco and Oakland, via Yerba Buena Island (formerly Goat Island). The group intended to place the plaque on the recently opened San Francisco–Oakland Bay Bridge or, failing that, the new Transbay Terminal. This was not approved by the bridge authorities, however, and the plaque was installed at the Cliff House in 1955. It was moved to the Transbay Terminal in 1986, in connection with the 50th anniversary of the bridge. The Terminal was closed and demolished in 2010 as part of the project to construct a new Transbay Transit Center, and the plaque was placed in storage. After being restored in late 2018, the plaque was rededicated and reinstalled at the new transit center in September 2019 but, after being vandalized in 2020, was moved in 2021 to Molloy's Tavern, in Colma, Calif.

There have been two 21st-century campaigns to name all or parts of the Bay Bridge for Emperor Norton.
 2004–2005
San Francisco District 3 Supervisor Aaron Peskin introduced a resolution to the San Francisco Board of Supervisors in November 2004, after a campaign by San Francisco Chronicle cartoonist Phil Frank calling for the entire bridge to be named for Norton. 
On December 14, 2004, the Board approved a modified version of this resolution, calling for only "new additions," i.e., the planned replacement for the bridge's eastern section, to be named "The Emperor Norton Bridge". Neither the City of Oakland nor Alameda County passed any similar resolution, so the effort went no further.

 2013–2022
In June 2013, eight members of the California Assembly and two members of the California Senate introduced a resolution to name the western section of the bridge for former California state Speaker and San Francisco Mayor Willie Brown. In response, there have been public efforts seeking to revive the earlier Emperor Norton effort. An online petition launched in August 2013 calls for the entire bridge system to be named for him. The petition was the impetus for the creation of The Emperor's Bridge Campaign—now known as The Emperor Norton Trust—which carried forward the bridge-naming effort through 2022, citing the precedent of 30 California bridges for which the state has authorized multiple names. The Trust called on the legislature simply to add "Emperor Norton Bridge" as an honorary name for the Bay Bridge, leaving in place all existing names. Most recently, the organization hoped to sponsor a legislative resolution that would take effect in 2022, the 150th anniversary of Emperor Norton's proclamations of 1872, setting out the original vision for the bridge. The legislature did not take up the issue in 2022, and the Trust currently has suspended its bridge-naming effort.

Clock tower of the San Francisco Ferry Building
In October 2022, The Emperor Norton Trust announced a new effort to have the San Francisco Ferry Building clock tower named "The Emperor Norton Tower" in 2023 — the 125th anniversary of the opening of the building in 1898.

See also

 Bummer and Lazarus
 Frederick Coombs
 José Sarria
 Frank Chu
 Rene Francois Joseph de Warren, claimed to be the "self proclaimed Duke" of Warren-Surrey.
 Matti Klemettilä, Finnish merchant and monarchist who went bankrupt during World War I and reinvented himself as "King Matti I" in 1937. He would regularly visit the Parliament House sending letters for MPS offering list of ministers for government, becoming an unoffical mascot of the House. In 1950 he invited the entire Parliament for a dinner and, while none showed up, Klemettilä received numerous congratulatory telegrams. In 1955 then Prime Minister Urho Kekkonen sent him a congratulatory telegram. In 1960, Yleisradio studio aired a tongue-in-cheek broadcast of Klemettilä' declaration of sovereignty after he marched there and asked for permission.

Notes

References
 
 
 Cowan, Robert Ernest. "Norton I, Emperor of the United States and Protector of Mexico (Joshua A. Norton, 1819–1880)" in Quarterly of the California Historical Society, October, 1923. San Francisco: California Historical Society, 1923.
 Cowan, Robert E., et al. The Forgotten Characters of Old San Francisco. Los Angeles: The Ward Ritchie Press, 1964.
 
 
 
 
 Lumea, John (2014–present). Articles on the life and legacy of Emperor Norton for The Emperor Norton Trust.

External links

 The Emperor Norton Trust, nonprofit that advances the legacy of Emperor Norton through research, education and advocacy
 "Emperor Norton's Grave" at Atlas Obscura

1810s births
1880 deaths
American folklore
History of San Francisco
Culture of San Francisco
People from San Francisco
Financial District, San Francisco
North Beach, San Francisco
English emigrants to the United States
American people of English-Jewish descent
People from Deptford
English Jews
English emigrants to South Africa
South African Jews
South African emigrants to the United States
American monarchists
Former monarchies of North America
Self-proclaimed monarchy
Pretenders
Discordianism
California folklore
Emperor Norton
19th-century monarchs in North America
Burials at Woodlawn Memorial Park Cemetery (Colma, California)
Burials at Masonic Cemetery (San Francisco)